Mahaddhoo is one of the uninhabited islands of Gaafu Alif Atoll belonging to the Maldives.

References

Uninhabited islands of the Gaafu Alif Atoll

Araigaiththaa · Baavandhoo · Baberaahuttaa · Bakeiththaa · Beyruhuttaa · Beyrumaddoo · Bihuréhaa · Boaddoo · Bodéhuttaa · Budhiyahuttaa · Dhevvalaabadhoo · Dhevvamaagalaa · Dhigémaahuttaa · Dhigudhoo · Dhigurah · Dhonhuseenahuttaa · Falhumaafushi · Falhuverrehaa · Farudhulhudhoo · Fénéhuttaa · Fenrahaa · Fenrahaahuttaa · Funadhoovillingili · Funamaddoo · Galamadhoo · Haagevillaa · Hadahaa · Hagedhoo · Heenamaagalaa · Hirihuttaa · Hithaadhoo · Hithaadhoogalaa · Hulhimendhoo · Hunadhoo · Hurendhoo · Idimaa · Innaréhaa · Kalhehuttaa · Kalhudhiréhaa · Kanduvillingili · Keesseyréhaa · Kendheraa · Koduhuttaa · Kondeymatheelaabadhoo · Kondeyvillingili · Kudalafari · Kuddoo · Kudhébondeyyo · Kudhéfehélaa · Kudhéhuttaa · Kureddhoo · Lhossaa · Maadhiguvaru · Maaféhélaa · Maagehuttaa · Maakanaarataa · Maamutaa · Maarandhoo · Maaréhaa · Mahaddhoo · Maththidhoo · Maththuréhaa · Médhuburiyaa · Médhuhuttaa · Medhuréhaa · Melaimu · Meradhoo · Minimensaa · Munaagala · Munandhoo · Odagallaa · Raaverrehaa · Rinbidhoo · Thinrukéréhaa · Uhéréhaa · Viligillaa · Vodamulaa

Uninhabited islands of the Maldives